Colonel Stephen R. Henley is an American lawyer and an officer in the United States Army.

He is notable for having been appointed the President of a Guantanamo military commission.

President of a Guantanamo military commission
The first hearing Henley presided over took place on June 19, 2008.
Brigadier General Thomas W. Hartmann the legal advisor to the convening authority—the number two in the Office of Military Commissions testified before the commission. Captain Keith J. Allred, the President of Salim Ahmed Hamdan's military commission had previously proscribed Hartmann from participating. Major David Frakt of the  United States Air Force Reserve, defending Mohammed Jawad, was challenging Hartmann's role in choosing Mohammed Jawad's case for prosecution.

On August 14, 2008, Henley barred Hartmann from any further involvement in Mohammed Jawad's military commission.
According to Mike Melia, writing for the Associated Press, Henley ruled that Hartmann: ''"...compromised his objectivity in public statements aligning himself with prosecutors and defending the Pentagon's system for prosecuting alleged terrorists."

However, Henley chose not to dismiss the charges against Jawad because of Hartmann's controversial conduct.  
He did rule that Frakt was authorized to submit arguments for dropping the charges against Jawad directly to Susan J. Crawford, the Convening Authority, as to whether charges against Jawad were justified.

In July 2009, US District Court Judge Ellen Huvelle concluded consideration of Mohammed Jawad' habeas corpus petition, and was ruled a civilian.
On July 28, 2009, Frakt filed a motion before Henley, following Huvelle's ruling.
He argued that the military commissions were only authorized to try illegal enemy combatants, and since he was officially a civilian, his military commission lacked jurisdiction.

References

Year of birth missing
Year of death missing
Guantanamo Military Commission members
United States Army officers
American lawyers